Torre Boldone is a comune (municipality) in the Province of Bergamo in the Italian region of Lombardy, located about  northeast of Milan and about  northeast of Bergamo, at the entrance of the Valle Seriana. Part of Torre Boldone's territory is part of Parco dei Colli di Bergamo

References

External links
 Official website